The Yale Law & Policy Review is a biannual student-run law review at the Yale Law School covering the intersection of law and policy. Past contributors include Supreme Court Justices Ruth Bader Ginsburg, John Paul Stevens, and Clarence Thomas; President Bill Clinton; Vice President Al Gore; Secretaries of State Hillary Clinton and Cyrus Vance; Senators Bill Frist, Ted Kennedy, Joe Lieberman, and Arlen Specter; Ambassador John Negroponte; and Professors Richard Epstein, Harold Koh, Robert Post, and Cass Sunstein. The 2007 ExpressO Guide to Top Law Reviews ranked the journal first among law and society law reviews based on the number of manuscripts received. The current Editors-in-Chief are Selena Kitchens and Joshua Schenk.

Notable authors and articles 

 William Jefferson Clinton (2014). “The Voting Rights Umbrella”. Yale Law & Policy Review. 33: 383.
 Hillary Rodham Clinton (2005). “Brown at Fifty: Fulfilling the Promise”. Yale Law & Policy Review. 23: 213.
 Ruth Bader Ginsburg (2004). “Looking Beyond Our Borders: The Value of a Comparative Perspective in Constitutional Adjudication”. Yale Law & Policy Review. 22: 329.
 Janet Napolitano (2014). “Only Yes Means Yes: An Essay on University Policies regarding Sexual Violence and Sexual Assault”. Yale Law & Policy Review. 33: 387.
Dana Remus (2011). "Just Conduct: Regulating Bench-Bar Relationships." 
Dana Remus (2012). "The Institutional Politics of Federal Judicial Conduct Regulation."
 Owen Fiss (2012). “Even in a Time of Terror”. Yale Law & Policy Review. 31: 1.
 John Paul Stevens and Linda Greenhouse (2011). “A Conversation with Justice Stevens”. Yale Law & Policy Review. 30: 304.
 Marin K. Levy; Kate Stith; and Jose A. Cabranes (2009). “The Costs of Judging Judges by the Numbers”. Yale Law & Policy Review. 28: 313.
 William H. Pryor, Jr. (2006). “The Religious Faith and Judicial Duty of an American Catholic Judge”. Yale Law & Policy Review. 24: 347.
 Dan M. Kahan and Donald Braman (2006). “Cultural Cognition and Public Policy”. Yale Law & Policy Review. 24: 149.
 Robert Post (2005). “Affirmative Action and Higher Education: The View from Somewhere”. Yale Law & Policy Review. 23: 25.
John Podesta and Raj Goyle (2005). "Lost in Cyberspace? Finding American Liberties in a Dangerous Digital World."
 Judith S. Kaye (2004). “Delivering Justice Today: A Problem-Solving Approach”. Yale Law & Policy Review. 22: 125.
 Charles J. Ogletree Jr. (2002). “From Pretoria to Philadelphia: Judge Higginbotham’s Racial Justice Jurisprudence on South Africa and the United States”. Yale Law & Policy Review. 20: 383.
 Shira A. Scheindlin and John Elofson (1998). “Judges, Juries, and Sexual Harassment”. Yale Law & Policy Review. 17: 813.
 Stacey Y. Abrams (1998). “Devolution’s Discord: Resolving Operational Dissonance with the UBIT Exemption”. Yale Law & Policy Review.17: 877.
 Judith Resnik and Emily Bazelon (1998). “Legal Services: Then and Now”. Yale Law & Policy Review. 17: 291. 
 Robert W. Sweet (1998). “Civil Gideon and Confidence in a Just Society”. Yale Law & Policy Review. 17: 503.
 Joseph Lieberman (1997). “The Politics of Money and the Road to Self-Destruction”. Yale Law & Policy Review. 16: 425.
 Michael S. Dukakis (1992). “Hawaii and Massachusetts: Lessons from the States”. Yale Law & Policy Review. 10: 397.
 Eleanor Holmes Norton (1990). “The End of the Griggs Economy: Doctrinal Adjustment for the New American Workplace”. Yale Law & Policy Review. 8: 197.
 Harold Hongju Koh (1988). “Overview: Four Dichotomies in American Trade Policy”. Yale Law & Policy Review. 6: 4.
 Susan Rose-Ackerman (1988). “Public Policy in the Public Interest”. Yale Law & Policy Review. 6: 505.
 Clarence Thomas (1986). “Affirmative Action Goals and Timetables: Too Tough? Not Tough Enough!,” Yale Law & Policy Review. 5: 402.
 Marian Wright Edelman and James D. Weill (1985). “Investing in our Children”. Yale Law & Policy Review. 4: 331.
 Edward M. Kennedy (1985). “Reconsidering Social Welfare Policy: Introduction”. Yale Law & Policy Review. 4: 1.
 Maxine F. Singer (1984). “Genetics and the Law: A Scientist’s View”. Yale Law & Policy Review. 3: 315.
 Albert Gore, Jr. and Steve Owens (1984) “The Challenge of Biotechnology”. Yale Law & Policy Review. 3: 336.
 Stephen L. Carter (1984). “The Bellman, the Snark, and the Biohazard Debate”. Yale Law & Policy Review. 3: 358. 
 Richard Neely (1984). “The Primary Caretaker Parent Rule: Child Custody and the Dynamics of Greed”. Yale Law & Policy Review. 3: 168.
 Catherine A. MacKinnon (1983). “Not A Moral Issue”. Yale Law & Policy Review. 3: 321.
 Cyrus R. Vance (1982). “Reforming the Electoral Reforms”. Yale Law & Policy Review. 1: 151.

Notable alumni and former editors 
 Bruce Ackerman, American constitutional law scholar (appears in Vol. 1:1)
Wally Adeyamo, United States deputy secretary of the treasury (appears in Vol. 24:1)
Emily Bazelon, journalist and staff writer for the New York Times Magazine (appears in Vol. 16:1)
Monica Bell, Yale Law professor (appears in Vol. 24:1)
Jonathan Cedarbaum, deputy counsel to President Biden and legal adviser to the National Security Council (appears in Vol. 12:1)
Hunter Biden, second son of President Joe Biden (appears in Vol. 14:2)
  Steven Colloton, federal judge on the 8th Circuit (appears in Vol. 4:2)
Brian Deese, 13th Director of the National Economic Council, serving under President Joe Biden (appears in Vol. 24:1)
Addisu Demissie, political strategist and campaign manager (appears in Vol. 25:1)
Owen Fiss, Yale Law professor (appears in Vol. 1:1)
Jesse Furman, federal judge of the Southern District of New York
Paul Gewirtz, Yale Law professor (appears in Vol. 1:1)
Abbe Gluck, Yale Law professor and Special Counsel on President Biden's Covid-19 team (appears in Vol. 16:1)
Joshua Hawley, United States Senator from Missouri (appears in Vol. 22:1)
 Dawn Johnsen, former Office of Legal Counsel employee, professor at Indiana University School of Law (appears in Vol. 2:1)
 Zachary D. Kaufman, legal academic and social entrepreneur (Editor-in-Chief Vol. 27:1, 27:2)
Matt Klapper, former chief of staff to U.S. Senator Cory Booker and current chief of staff to Attorney General Merrick Garland. 
 David Lat, founder and managing editor of the blog Above the Law
 Adam Liptak, current Supreme Court correspondent for the New York Times (appears in Vol. 4:2)
 Goodwin Liu, Justice of the Supreme Court of California, former Berkeley Law professor and nominee to the 9th Circuit (appears in Vol. 13:2)
 Daniel H. Pink, New York Times bestselling author of Drive and A Whole New Mind (Editor-in-Chief Vol 8:2, 9:1)
Cristina Rodriguez, Yale Law professor (appears in Vol. 16:1)
Benjamin Sachs, Professor of Labor and Industry at Harvard Law School
 Reva Siegel, Yale Law School professor
Jake Sullivan, National Security Advisor to President Joe Biden (appears in Vol. 19:1)
 Gene Sperling, director of the National Economic Council and assistant to the president for economic policy under Presidents Bill Clinton and Barack Obama; Senior Advisor to President Joe Biden (appears in Vol. 1:2)
Neera Tanden, former president of the Center for American Progress, White House Staff Secretary and Senior Advisor to President Joe Biden (appears in Vol. 14:1)
Joseph Tsai, co-founder and executive vice chairman of Chinese multinational technology company Alibaba Group (appears in Vol 5:1).

References

External links
 
 Inter Alia, the journal's "Online Companion"

American law journals
Yale Law School
Biannual journals
Publications established in 1982
English-language journals
1982 establishments in Connecticut
Law journals edited by students
Law and public policy journals